Badwaha Assembly constituency is one of the 230 Vidhan Sabha (Legislative Assembly) constituencies of Madhya Pradesh state in central India.

It is part of Khargone District.

Members of Legislative Assembly
The current MLA is Sachin Birla.

Election results

2018

2013

References

Assembly constituencies of Madhya Pradesh